Howard Davis (born 27 April 1967) was a Jamaican athlete who competed mainly in the 400 metres.

He competed for Jamaica in the 1988 Summer Olympics held in Seoul, South Korea in the 4 x 400 metre relay where he won the Silver medal with his teammates Devon Morris, Winthrop Graham and Bertland Cameron.

References

Sports Reference

1967 births
Living people
Jamaican male sprinters
Olympic silver medalists for Jamaica
Athletes (track and field) at the 1988 Summer Olympics
Athletes (track and field) at the 1992 Summer Olympics
Olympic athletes of Jamaica
Junior college men's track and field athletes in the United States
Medalists at the 1988 Summer Olympics
Olympic silver medalists in athletics (track and field)
Universiade medalists in athletics (track and field)
Universiade gold medalists for Jamaica
Medalists at the 1989 Summer Universiade
Medalists at the 1991 Summer Universiade